Assault of Thieves (Spanish - Asalto de ladrones) is an oil painting made by Francisco de Goya between 1793 and 1794. It is part of a private collection owned by Juan Abelló.

See also
List of works by Francisco Goya

References

Bibliography

External links

Paintings by Francisco Goya
Genre paintings
1794 paintings
1794 in Spain
Landscape paintings